Milford is the civil parish and large village which is south west of Godalming in Surrey, England which was a small village in the early medieval period — it grew significantly after the building of the Portsmouth Direct Line which serves Godalming railway station and its own minor stop railway station. The village, served by a wide array of shops and amenities, has to one side an all-directions junction of the A3, one of Britain's trunk roads. Nearby settlements are Eashing, Shackleford,
Witley and Elstead, and the hamlets of Enton and Hydestile, all of which are in the Borough of Waverley. The west of the parish is in the Surrey Hills AONB.

Transportation
Until the 1990s, the A3 road ran through the village (it now bypasses it to the west). Milford is still an important road junction, where the A283 road and A286 roads leave the A3 and run south to West Sussex.

Education
Milford has a primary school, Milford Infant School and a secondary school, Rodborough School.

Facilities

The Church of England Parish Church is St. John the Evangelist, on Church Road. There is also St Joseph's Roman Catholic Church on Portsmouth Road, and Milford Baptist Church on New Road. Milford has a post office, a Chinese takeaway shop, a fish and chip shop, a shop selling art and crafts made by people in the area, called the Surrey Guild Craft shop, located at the top of Moushill lane, veterinary surgery, an off-licence, a butcher and fishmonger, two dry-cleaners, a corner shop co-op, a Tesco Express, a hairdresser, two beauticians, two doctors' surgeries, a petrol station, a swing park, a social club and a pub, The Refectory.

The village also has a cricket green and a football pitch which is home to Milford & Witley Football Club and Milford Cricket Club, who have two teams who play in the Saturday I'Anson League. Here, the Burton Pavilion also hosts dance, yoga and pilates classes. Another green in the village, the Jubilee field, is used for village fêtes and travelling funfairs & circuses. Milford also has Brownie and Guide Companies and Scouting units. Milford also has a Bowling Green and club. Additionally, Milford is the home of Milford Pumas Youth Football Club, a community youth football club serving 7- to 17-year-old boys and girls.

Milford Hospital is a former sanitorium that is now the rehabilitation centre for the Guildford and Waverley districts.

Notable residents
 
James Archer, painter
Philip Barker-Webb, botanist
Judith Blunt-Lytton, 16th Baroness Wentworth, peer, Arabian horse breeder and real tennis player
Neville Bulwer-Lytton, 3rd Earl of Lytton, military officer, Olympian and artist
Sir Peter Bottomley, Conservative Member of Parliament
Virginia Bottomley, Baroness Bottomley of Nettlestone, Conservative peer and former Secretary of State for Health
Sir George Deacon, oceanographer
Sir James Gault, military assistant to General Dwight Eisenhower during World War II
Mark Gravett, Hampshire cricketer
Sir Laurence Guillemard, Governor of the Straits Settlements
Richard Harvey, Archdeacon of Halifax
Francis Holl, engraver
Dame Penelope Keith, actress
Robert Kinglake, rower and barrister
Mark Lambert, Harlequins rugby player
George Luker, painter
Jamie Mackie, Queens Park Rangers and Scotland footballer
Humphry Osmond, psychiatrist
Beresford Potter, Archdeacon in Cyprus and Syria
Nora S. Unwin, children's author and illustrator
John Dawson Watson, painter
Bob Wyatt, Worcestershire and England cricketer

In Popular Culture
In 1970 the Doctor Who serial - Doctor Who and the Silurians was partly filmed at Milford Hospital. In the series it was called the Wenley Hospital. The actual filming took place in November 1969.

Milford is mentioned in Aldous Huxley's book Brave New World.

References

External links

Villages in Surrey
Borough of Waverley